Blacy is the name of the following communes in France:

 Blacy, Marne, in the Marne department
 Blacy, Yonne, in the Yonne department